The acronym PLSS may refer to:
Public Land Survey System, a method used in the United States to survey and identify land parcels
Primary Life Support System, the life-support backpack of a space suit